Tom Matthews (1920 or 1921–2002) was an English local councillor, five times mayor, and councillor of the former district of Tenbury Wells, Worcestershire, England. A local politician since 1947, in 1983 he was awarded the MBE for services to local government. In 1981, Matthews was Chairman of the former Leominster District Council and a  member of Malvern Hills District Council from 1998 to 2000.  During World War II he was a prisoner of war in Germany. He died on October 18, 2002 at the age of 81.

Notes

2002 deaths
Politicians from Worcestershire
Mayors of places in Worcestershire
Year of birth uncertain
Members of the Order of the British Empire